Avia Traffic Company is an airline with its head office in Bishkek, Kyrgyzstan. Its flights operate from Manas International Airport.

The airline is on the List of air carriers banned in the European Union.

Destinations
As of December 2019, Avia Traffic Company operates scheduled passenger flights to the following destinations:

Sharm El Sheikh (Sharm El Sheikh Airport) 

Delhi (Indira Gandhi International Airport)

Almaty (Almaty International Airport)

Bishkek (Manas International Airport) Base
Isfana (Isfana Airport)
Osh (Osh Airport)
Jalal-Abad (Jalal-Abad Airport)

Grozny (Grozny Airport) 
Irkutsk (International Airport Irkutsk)
Kazan (Kazan International Airport)
Krasnodar (Pashkovsky Airport)
Krasnoyarsk (Yemelyanovo Airport)
Moscow
Moscow Domodedovo Airport
Zhukovsky International Airport
Novosibirsk (Tolmachevo Airport)
Samara (Kurumoch International Airport)
Surgut (Surgut Airport)
St Petersburg (Pulkovo International Airport)
Voronezh (Voronezh Airport)
Yekaterinburg (Koltsovo International Airport)

Dushanbe (Dushanbe Airport)

Antalya (Antalya Airport)
Istanbul (Istanbul Airport) (resumes 20 February 2020)

Fleet

Current fleet
The Avia Traffic Company fleet includes the following aircraft (as of March 2022):

Former fleet
The airline previously operated the following aircraft:
 2 British Aerospace 146-200
 1 further Boeing 737-300
 1 Boeing 737-500

Accidents
On 22 November 2015, a Boeing 737-300 registration EX-37005, operating as Avia Traffic Company Flight 768, touched down hard at Osh Airport injuring 8, and causing all the landing gear to be ripped off. The aircraft skidded off the runway and the left engine was ripped off.

References

External links

Avia Traffic Company 
Avia Traffic Company Fleet

Airlines banned in the European Union
Airlines of Kyrgyzstan
Airlines established in 2003
2003 establishments in Kyrgyzstan